Williams Gibbons Schindler (July 10, 1896 – February 6, 1979) was a Major League Baseball catcher who played for the St. Louis Cardinals in .

External links

1896 births
1979 deaths
Major League Baseball catchers
St. Louis Cardinals players
Baseball players from Missouri
People from Perryville, Missouri
Miami Indians players
Independence Producers players